Willie Thomas (born August 14, 1955) is a former professional Canadian football offensive lineman who played 10 seasons in the Canadian Football League for four different teams. Thomas played college football at the University of Calgary.

References

Career stats

1955 births
Living people
Players of Canadian football from Manitoba
Canadian football offensive linemen
Calgary Dinos football players
Calgary Stampeders players
Winnipeg Blue Bombers players
Saskatchewan Roughriders players
Toronto Argonauts players